Arrepentidos is an American television series directed by Lilo Vilaplana for Nat Geo Mundo. The series won an International Emmy.

References

External links
 
 Official website

2014 American television series debuts
2010s American crime drama television series
Spanish-language television shows
National Geographic (American TV channel) original programming